The Mongol mythology is the traditional religion of the Mongols.

Creation 
There are many Mongol creation myths. In the most ancient one, the creation of the world is attributed to a Buddhist deity Lama. At the start of time, there was only water, and from the heavens, Lama came down to it holding an iron rod with which he began to stir. As he began to stir the water, the stirring brought about a wind and fire which caused a thickening at the centre of the waters to form the earth. Another narrative also attributes the creation of heaven and earth to a lama who is called Udan. Udan began by separating earth from heaven, and then dividing heaven and earth both into nine stories, and creating nine rivers. After the creation of the earth itself, the first male and female couple were created out of clay. They would become the progenitors of all humanity.

In another example the world began as an agitating gas which grew increasingly warm and damp, precipitating a heavy rain that created the oceans. Dust and sand emerged to the surface and became earth. Yet another account tells of the Buddha Sakyamuni searching the surface of the sea for a means to create the earth and spotted a golden frog. From its east side, Buddha pierced the frog through, causing it to spin and face north. From its mouth burst fire, and its rump streamed water. Buddha tossed golden sand on his back which became land. And this was the origin of the five earthly elements, wood and metal from the arrow, and fire, water and sand. These myths date from the 17th century when Yellow Shamanism (Tibetan Buddhism using shamanistic forms) was established in Mongolia. Black Shamanism and White Shamanism from pre-Buddhist times survive only in far-northern Mongolia (around Lake Khuvsgul) and the region around Lake Baikal where Lamaist persecution had not been effective.

Deities
 Bai-Ulgan and Esege Malan are creator deities. 
 Ot is the goddess of marriage. 
 Tung-ak is the patron god of tribal chiefs and the ruler of the lesser spirits of Mongol mythology
 Erlig Khan (Erlik Khan) is the King of the Underworld.
 Daichi Tengri is the red god of war to whom enemy soldiers were sometimes sacrificed during battle campaigns. 
 Zaarin Tengri is a spirit who gives Khorchi (in the Secret History of the Mongols) a vision of a cow mooing "Heaven and earth have agreed to make Temujin (later Genghis Khan) the lord of the nation". 
 The sky god Tengri is attested from the Xiongnu of the 2nd century BC. The Xiongnu may not have been Mongol, but Tengri is common to several Central Asian peoples, including the Mongols.

The wolf, falcon, deer and horse were important symbolic animals.

Texts and myths

The Uliger are traditional epic tales and the Epic of King Gesar is shared with much of Central Asia and Tibet.

The Epic of King Gesar (Ges'r, Kesar) is a Mongol religious epic about Geser (also known as Buche Beligte), a prophet of Tengriism.

See also
Alpamysh
Epic of Manas
Manchurian mythology
Scythian mythology
Shamanism in Siberia
The Secret History of the Mongols
Tibetan mythology
Tungusic mythology
Turco-Mongol tradition
Turkic mythology

Notes

References
Walter Heissig, The Religions of Mongolia, Kegan Paul (2000).
 Myths Connected With Mongol Religion, A Journey in Southern Siberia, by Jeremiah Curtin.
Gerald Hausman, Loretta Hausman, The Mythology of Horses: Horse Legend and Lore Throughout the Ages (2003), 37-46.
Yves Bonnefoy, Wendy Doniger, Asian Mythologies, University Of Chicago Press (1993), 315-339.
满都呼, 中国阿尔泰语系诸民族神话故事(folklores of Chinese Altaic races).民族出版社, 1997. .
贺灵, 新疆宗教古籍资料辑注(materials of old texts of Xinjiang religions).新疆人民出版社, May 2006. .
 
 
S. G. Klyashtornyj, 'Political Background of the Old Turkic Religion' in: Oelschlägel, Nentwig, Taube (eds.), "Roter Altai, gib dein Echo!" (FS Taube), Leipzig, 2005, 260-265.

External links
Alpamysh
Shamanism in Mongolia and Tibet
 The Altaic Epic
 Tengri on Mars

 
Creation myths
Tengriism